Jonathon Paul Feyereisen (born February 7, 1993) is an American professional baseball pitcher for the Los Angeles Dodgers of Major League Baseball (MLB). He made his MLB debut with the Milwaukee Brewers in 2020 and has also played for the Tampa Bay Rays.

Career

Amateur career
Feyereisen attended River Falls High School in River Falls, Wisconsin and played college baseball at the University of Wisconsin at Stevens Point, and summer collegiate baseball with the Wisconsin Rapids Rafters.

Cleveland Indians
The Cleveland Indians selected Feyereisen in the 16th round of the 2014 Major League Baseball (MLB) draft. He signed with the Indians and was assigned to the Mahoning Valley Scrappers, where he spent the whole season, pitching 17 scoreless innings, striking out 24.

In 2015, he played for both the Lake County Captains and the Lynchburg Hillcats, posting a combined 1–1 win-loss record with 12 saves and a 2.08 earned run average (ERA) in  innings pitched, in which he struck out 56 batters between the two teams. In 2016, he began the season with the Akron RubberDucks.

New York Yankees
On July 31, 2016, the Indians traded Feyereisen along with Clint Frazier, Justus Sheffield, and Ben Heller to the New York Yankees in exchange for Andrew Miller. The Yankees assigned him to the Trenton Thunder where he finished the season. In 42 games between both Akron and Trenton, he pitched to a 7–3 record, five saves, 1.70 ERA, and a 1.10 WHIP as he had 78 strikeouts in 58.1 innings.

In 2017, he spent time with both Trenton and the Scranton/Wilkes-Barre RailRiders, posting a combined 2–3 record with four saves and a 3.27 ERA in  total innings between both clubs.

In 2018, he spent with Scranton/Wilkes-Barre, going 6–6 with one save and a 3.45 ERA in 60 innings. He returned to Scranton/Wilkes-Barre for the 2019 season, going 10–2 with seven saves and a 2.49 ERA and 94 strikeouts in 61 innings.

Milwaukee Brewers
On September 2, 2019, Feyereisen was traded to the Milwaukee Brewers in exchange for Brenny Escanio and international signing bonus pool money. After the season, on October 10, he was selected for the United States national baseball team in the 2019 WBSC Premier 12. After the season, he was added to the Brewers 40-man roster.

Feyereisen made the 2020 opening day roster for the Brewers. He made his major league debut on July 24, pitching one inning. He struck out former MVP Kris Bryant, then giving up a solo home run to Anthony Rizzo against the Chicago Cubs.

In 2021, Feyereisen again made the Opening Day roster for Milwaukee. Through his 21 appearances with the Brewers, Feyereisen went 0–2 with a 3.26 ERA and a WHIP of 1.09.

Tampa Bay Rays

On May 21, 2021, the Brewers traded Feyereisen and Drew Rasmussen to the Tampa Bay Rays in exchange for Willy Adames and Trevor Richards. In 2022, Feyereisen allowed one unearned run in  innings pitched, limiting opposing hitters to a .086 batting average against, before injuring his shoulder in June.

After the 2022 season, Feyereisen underwent surgery to repair the labrum and rotator cuff in his right shoulder, likely causing him to miss the beginning of the 2023 season. The Rays designated him for assignment on December 13.

Los Angeles Dodgers 
On December 14, 2022, the Rays traded Feyereisen to the Los Angeles Dodgers for minor league pitcher Jeff Belge.

References

External links

Wisconsin–Stevens Point Pointers bio

1993 births
Living people
Akron RubberDucks players
Baseball players from Wisconsin
Lake County Captains players
Lynchburg Hillcats players
Mahoning Valley Scrappers players
Major League Baseball pitchers
Milwaukee Brewers players
People from River Falls, Wisconsin
Scottsdale Scorpions players
Scranton/Wilkes-Barre RailRiders players
Tampa Bay Rays players
Trenton Thunder players
United States national baseball team players
Wisconsin–Stevens Point Pointers baseball players
2019 WBSC Premier12 players